Arab Media Forum (Arabic: منتدى الإعلام العربي) is an international media forum organized by Dubai Press Club, founded in 2001 and based at Dubai, United Arab Emirates.

See also 
 Dubai Press Club
 Abu Dhabi Media Summit

References

External links
 

Mass media in Dubai
2001 establishments in the United Arab Emirates